Silas M. Clark House, also known as Clark Memorial Hall and History House, is a historic home in Indiana, Pennsylvania, United States.  It was built from 1869 to 1870, and is a three-story, brick building with a cross-gable roof in Italian Villa-style.  It features round headed windows, a central tower, and arched entryway. It housed the local chapter of the American Red Cross from 1918 to 1930.  The building has housed the Indiana County Historical and Genealogical Society since 1951.

It was added to the National Register of Historic Places in 1978.

References

1870 establishments in Pennsylvania
History museums in Pennsylvania
Houses completed in 1870
Houses in Indiana County, Pennsylvania
Houses on the National Register of Historic Places in Pennsylvania
Indiana, Pennsylvania
Individually listed contributing properties to historic districts on the National Register in Pennsylvania
Italianate architecture in Pennsylvania
Museums in Indiana County, Pennsylvania
National Register of Historic Places in Indiana County, Pennsylvania
Victorian architecture in Pennsylvania